The Chofetz Chaim Heritage Foundation (established in 1989) is a non-profit Orthodox Jewish organization based in Monsey, New York, United States. The foundation is dedicated to spreading the teachings of Rabbi Israel Meir Kagan, known as the Chofetz Chaim (  "Seeker of Life" in Hebrew) and is based on his work of Jewish ethics of the same name. Rabbi Kagan’s work deals with the prohibitions of gossip, slander and defamation known as Lashon Hara in Jewish law (Halakha).

Its programs are in various Orthodox Jewish high schools, primarily those attended by girls. The Foundation has become a popular fixture in the English-speaking Orthodox world, using a vast array of communication tools, including books, tapes, video seminars, telephone classes and a newsletter. The foundation’s website asserts belief in the "Torah's timeless recipe for building a world of compassion and harmony.”

The Chofetz Chaim Heritage Foundation has raised significant funds by advertising its activities and events in publications such as the Yated Ne'eman (United States), Hamodia, The Jewish Press and others, as well as by distributing newsletters to the English-speaking Orthodox and Haredi public.

The founder and director of the foundation is Michael Rothschild.

Work
The Chofetz Chaim Heritage Foundation's publications and programs emphasize the importance of the mitzvot ("commandments") of not speaking lashon hara or the spread of any form of slander. They've published material to help Jewish couples navigate the maze of finding a marriage partner without violating the guidelines of the Torah's prohibitions of slander or hearsay.

See also
 Chofetz Chaim (disambiguation).

References

External links
 Chofetz Chaim Heritage Foundation

Jewish educational organizations
Orthodox Judaism in New York (state)